Jane Marsh Parker (Marsh; pen name, Jenny Marsh Parker; June 16, 1836 – March 13, 1913) was an American author and historian of the long nineteenth century. She was a frequent contributor to The Churchman and other publications of the Protestant Episcopal church. She was the author of novels and religious works, including Toiling and Hoping (New York, 1856); The Boy Missionary (1859); Losing the Way (1860); Under His Banner (1862); The Morgan Boys (1859); Rochester, a Story Historical (Rochester, 1884); The Midnight Cry (New York, 1886); Life of S. F. B. Morse (1887); and Papers Relating to the Genesee Country (1888), among other publications. A pioneer clubwoman, Parker founded the Fortnightly Ignorance Club of Rochester, New York, which was the first women's club in the state after Sorosis.

Early life and education
Permelia Jane Marsh was born in Milan, New York, on June 16, 1836. The father, Rev. Joseph Marsh, was a Campbellite minister, who adopted the views of William Miller and was a leader in the Second Advent movement in 1843-50. The mother, Sarah Adams Marsh, was a descendent from John Quincy Adams. Parker had two sisters, Sarah Eliza Marsh (1832-1900) and Mary Maria Marsh (1834-1900).

She was educated in Rochester.

Career
On August 26, 1856, she married George Tan Parker, an attorney (and later a judge) of Rochester. Their children were, Richard Marsh Parker (1859-1934), George Force Parker (1866-1946), Henry Nelly Parker (1869-1970), and Margaret Marsh Parker (1871-1951).

As a writer, Parker was well-known throughout the country, sometimes using the pen name, "Jenny Marsh Parker". She contributed to all the leading periodicals, including that of the Episcopal Church, as well as Harper's Magazine and The Century Magazines. She was one of the Spectator's Club contributors to The Outlook, and a member of the Contributors' Club, writing for the Atlantic Monthly.

She wrote a number of children's stories as well as more important works. Parker's historical writings include histories of Rochester, the Genesee Valley, the Iroquois, and the Jesuits. Treating the Millerite delusions, which prevailed during her childhood, was a special literary field. She wrote the "Little Millerite", published in The Century Magazine in 1886. Shortly before that, she had published her novel, The Midnight Cry, a tale in which she gives a vivid account of the Millerite delusion, writing from personal knowledge, having been brought up in tha t faith.

Parker was one of the founders of the Rochester Historical Society and was its first corresponding secretary. She was a member of Daughters of the American Revolution, Irondequoit Chapter, Rochester. She also had the distinction of founding the first women's club in New York state after Sorosis, the Fortnightly Ignorance Club of Rochester. Instead of starting out with the assumption that the members have an abundance of knowledge upon every subject, the principal plank in its platform is, "We know nothing but seek knowledge". It started with half a dozen members meeting in Judge Parker's office. It soon grew to several hundred members with the chamber of commerce for its headquarters. At meetings, a paper was read, questions followed, and the subject chosen for the next meeting, one of which the members knew little but wished to know much.

Parker was one of the first women to oppose the placing of children in jails with hardened criminals, and it was largely through her efforts that the first matron was placed in the Rochester jail. She opposed women's suffrage. "If I should ever vote, it would be to cast a ballot against woman's suffrage."

Personal life
Parker was the friend of many noted persons. She corresponded with Hall Caine, George William Curtis, Henry James, Eugene Field, Justin Winsor, Francis Parker, and Susan B. Anthony. Mark Twain wrote:— "I greet you with pleasure; you were a good audience all by yourself."

In 1911, Parker moved from New York to Escondido, California. She died of bronchial pneumonia in Los Angeles, California on March 13, 1913, at the home of her daughter, Margaret. Interment was at Mount Hope Cemetery, Rochester.

Selected works

 Toiling and Hoping, 1856
 The Boy Missionary, 1858
 The Light of the World, Or, Footprints of Christ Our Lord, 1858
 Frank Earnest, Or Going Into the Master's Vineyard ..., 1858
 Seed for the Spring-time: Or, Common Names and Common Things, in the Church and Liturgy, Explained for Little Learners, 1858
 What a Little Child Should Know: Or, Simple Lessons on the Creed, Lord's Prayer, Ten Commandments, Etc, 1858
 Around the Manger; Or, Christmas, Past and Present,: With St. Chrysostom's Sermon, 1858
 Losing the Way, 1859
 The Morgan Boys, 1859
 L'Enfant missionnaire, histoire pour la jeunesse, par Mme J.M. Parker, traduction libre par Henry T. de Jersey, 1860
 Barley Wood: Or, Building on the Rock, 1860
 The Soldier of the Cross, Or, Life of St. Paul: Written for the Lambs of the Flock, 1861
 Around the Manger: Or, Christmas, Past and Present, 1861
 Under His Banner, 1862
 The Story of a Story-book, 1863
 Dick Wortley, Or, Choosing a Profession, 1863
 Under His Banner, 1869
 The Duty of the American White Woman to the American Black Woman, 1884
 Rochester: A Story Historical, 1884
 The Midnight Cry: A Novel, 1886
 Life of S. F. B. Morse, 1887
 Papers Relating to the Genesee Country, 1888
 An Evening with David Copperfield: A Literary and Musical Dickens Entertainment Comprising Readings, Impersonations, Tableaux, Pantomimes and Music, 1889
 The Opening of the Genesee Country, 1892
 The Jesuit Relations, 1894
 Christ Church, Rochester, Western New York: A Story, ..., 1905

References

Further reading
 Lane, Marcelle LeMénager, The Life and Work of Jane Marsh Parker (Rochester Historical Society, 1946)

External links
 

1836 births
1913 deaths
Daughters of the American Revolution people
19th-century American writers
19th-century American historians
19th-century American novelists
Clubwomen
People from Dutchess County, New York
Millerites
American children's writers
American religious novelists
People from Rochester, New York
19th-century pseudonymous writers
Pseudonymous women writers
Burials at Mount Hope Cemetery (Rochester)
American women novelists